Pelopidas conjuncta, the conjoined swift, is a butterfly belonging to the family Hesperiidae found in India.

Description

Subspecies
Pelopidas conjuncta conjuncta (N.Vietnam, Laos, Thailand and India (Himachal Pradesh to N.E. India; Andaman & Nicobar Is.))
Pelopidas conjuncta narooa  Moore, 1878 (India (Gujarat to Kerala and Jharkhand) and Sri Lanka)

Biology
The larvae are known to breed on Bambusa,  Coix lacryma-jobi, Oryza sativa,  Saccharum officinarum,  Sorghum halepense,  Triplopogon ramosissimus,  Zea mays, Rottboellia and cochinchinensis.

References

Pelopidas (skipper)
Butterflies of Asia
Butterflies described in 1869